Maxime Fabert, real name Robert Émile Jaillon, (7 November 1898 – 1 October 1878) was a French stage and film actor. Maxime Fabert managed the Theater of the Comédie-Wagram from 1946 to 1962.

Filmography 

 1932 : The Nude Woman by Jean-Paul Paulin as Tabourot
 1933 : Une vie perdue by Raymond Rouleau
 1935 : Les yeux noirs by Victor Tourjansky as a guest
 1937 :  The Red Dancer by Jean-Paul Paulin
 1937 : Double crime sur la ligne Maginot by Félix Gandera as Gunsmith
 1937 : Police mondaine by Michel Bernheim and Christian Chamborant
 1937 : Tamara la complaisante by Félix Gandera and Jean Delannoy as Padiloff
 1938 : L'Ange que j'ai vendu by Michel Bernheim
 1938 : Barnabé by Alexander Esway
 1938 : Métropolitain by Maurice Cam
 1938 : Trois artilleurs à l'opéra by André Chotin
 1939 : Moulin rouge by André Hugon as le commissaire
 1941 : Ce n'est pas moi by Jacques de Baroncelli
 1942 : Fièvres by Jean Delannoy as Charles
 1942 : The Guardian Angel  by Jacques de Casembroot as the gardener
 1942 : Coup de feu dans la nuit by Robert Péguy as a journalist
 1942 : The Trump Card by Jacques Becker as the suspicious jeweler
 1942 : The Lost Woman by Jean Choux as le contrôleur
 1942 : Forte tête by Léon Mathot as the gambler
 1942 : Haut-le-Vent by Jacques de Baroncelli
 1942 : L'Honorable Catherine by Marcel L'Herbier as a guest
 1942 : Huit hommes dans un château by Richard Pottier as the drunkard
 1943 : Monsieur des Lourdines by Pierre de Hérain as Saint-Crécy
 1943 : Coup de tête by René Le Hénaff
 1944 : Le Merle blanc by Jacques Houssin as Mr. Pénitent
 1944 : St. Val's Mystery by René Le Hénaff
 1948 : Les Aventures des Pieds-Nickelés by Marcel Aboulker as Dubarreau
 1947 : Une nuit à Tabarin by Karl Lamac as le notaire
 1948 : L'assassin est à l'écoute by Raoul André
 1949 : Amour et Compagnie by Gilles Grangier as a member of the executive office
 1949 : Forbidden to the Public by Alfred Pasquali as Robert
 1949 : The Unexpected Voyager  by Jean Stelli
 1950 : Avalanche by Raymond Sagard
 1950 : Folie douce by Jean-Paul Paulin
 1950 : Les Mémoires de la vache Yolande by Ernst Neubach as le commissaire
 1953 : Ma petite folie by Maurice Labro
 1955 : Deadlier Than the Male by Julien Duvivier as le patron de l'hôtel du Charolais
 1956 : Bonsoir Paris, bonjour l'amour by Ralph Baum and H. Leitner
 1958 : Les Motards by Jean Laviron as an official
 1959 : Les Héritiers by Jean Laviron as Roland
 1967 : The Most Beautiful Month by Guy Blanc as Julien
 1970 : Raphael, or The Debauched One by Michel Deville as the count

Theatre 

 1923 : Liliom by Ferenc Molnár, directed by Georges Pitoëff, Comédie des Champs-Élysées
 1923 : La Journée des aveux by Georges Duhamel, directed by Georges Pitoëff, Théâtre des Champs-Élysées
 1923 : L'Indigent by Charles Vildrac, directed by Georges Pitoëff, Comédie des Champs-Élysées 
 1923 : La Petite Baraque by Alexander Blok, directed by Georges Pitoëff, Comédie des Champs-Élysées
 1923 : Amédée et les messieurs en rang by Jules Romains, directed by Louis Jouvet, Comédie des Champs-Élysées
 1924 : Celui qui reçoit les gifles by Leonid Andreyev, directed by Georges Pitoëff, Comédie des Champs-Élysées
 1933 : Le Locataire du troisième sur la cour by Jerome K. Jerome, directed by Charles Edmond, Théâtre des Arts
 1936 : Lady Warner a disparu by Paul Chambard, Théâtre des Deux Masques 
 1936 : Que personne ne sorte by Fenn Sherie and Ingram D'Abbes, adaptation Paul Chambard, Théâtre des Deux Masques
 1937 : Deux de la police (Trois de la police) by Pierre Chambard and Marcel Dubois, directed by Max de Rieux, Théâtre des Deux Masques
 1937 : La Nuit du 7 by Michel Dulud, directed by Philippe Hersent, Théâtre des Capucines
 1938 : Les Deux Madame Carroll by Marguerite Veiller, Théâtre des Capucines
 1939 : C'est moi qui ai tué le Comte by Max Vierbo and Marcel Dubois after Alec Coppel, directed by Maurice Lagrenée, Théâtre de la Potinière
 1943 : Rêves à forfait by Marc-Gilbert Sauvajon, Théâtre Daunou
 1944 : Monseigneur by Michel Dulud, Théâtre Daunou
 1945 : Un ami viendra ce soir by Yvan Noé and Jacques Companeez, directed by Jean Wall, Théâtre de Paris
 1947 : Une mort sans importance by Yvan Noé and A. Linou, directed by Yvan Noé, Théâtre de la Potinière
 1948 :  by Roger Dornès and Jean Marsan, directed by Alfred Pasquali, Comédie-Wagram
 1955 : Ce diable d'ange by Pierre Destailles and Charles Michel, directed by Georges Vitaly, Comédie-Wagram
 1956 : Ce soir je dîne chez moi by Clare Kummer, directed by Christian-Gérard, Comédie-Wagram
 1959 : Mon ange by Solange Térac, directed by René Clermont, Comédie-Wagram
 1961 : Remue-ménage by Pierre Leloir, directed by Jean Marchat, Comédie-Wagram
 1962 : La Vénus de Milo by Jacques Deval, directed by Pierre Mondy, Théâtre du Gymnase   
 1963 : La Vénus de Milo by Jacques Deval, directed by Pierre Mondy, Théâtre des Célestins   
 1967 : L'erreur est juste by Jean Paxet, directed by Christian-Gérard, Théâtre des Arts

External links 
 40 films liés à Maxime Fabert on Ciné-Ressources.net
 

20th-century French male actors
French theatre managers and producers
Male actors from Paris
1898 births
1978 deaths